WHFG (91.3 FM) is a radio station licensed to serve the community of Lafayette, Louisiana, United States.

Programming
The station's weekday lineup includes Bible Answers Live, Pioneer Memorial Church, and C.D. Brooks.

External links
 

Christian radio stations in Louisiana
Lafayette Parish, Louisiana